This is a list of fellows of the Royal Society elected in 1712.

Fellows
 John Fortescue Aland, 1st Baron Fortescue of Credan (1670–1746)
 Giuseppe Averani (1662–1738)
 Jean Bernoulli (1667–1748)
 Patrick Blair (fl. 1708–1728)
 Richard Bradley (d. 1732)
 Thomas Bower (fl. 1703–1723)
 Rinaldo Duliolo (d. 1743)
 John Freind (1675–1728)
 Pietro Grimani (1677–1752)
 Robert Harley, 1st Earl of Oxford and Mortimer (1661–1724)
 George Hay, 8th Earl of Kinnoull (d. 1758)
 James Keill (1673–1719)
 John Kemp (1665–1717)
 Richard Myddleton Massey (c. 1678–1743)
 Samuel Molyneux (1689–1728)
 Peter Le Neve (1662–1729)
 Thomas Parker, 1st Earl of Macclesfield (1666–1732)
 Thomas Pellet (1671–1744)
 Thomas Rawlinson (1681–1725)
 Richard Richardson (1663–1741)
 Thomas Sprat (1679–1720)
 Brook Taylor (1685–1731)
 William Tempest (1682–1761)

References

1712
1712 in science
1712 in England